Evan Klamer (15 January 1923 – 28 April 1978) was a Danish cyclist. He competed in the tandem event at the 1948 Summer Olympics.

References

External links
 

1923 births
1978 deaths
Danish male cyclists
Olympic cyclists of Denmark
Cyclists at the 1948 Summer Olympics
Cyclists from Copenhagen